The Central Economic Work Conference is an annual meeting held in the People's Republic of China which sets the national agenda for the Economy of China and its financial and banking sectors. It is convened by the Central Committee of the Communist Party and the State Council following themes, keywords, set by the Politburo Standing Committee of the Chinese Communist Party. As of 2012, the meetings, which are closed, were being held for 2 or 3 days during the 2nd or 3rd week of December.

History
The 2012 conference was held over the weekend of December 15 and 16th. It was attended by all members of the Politburo Standing Committee of the Chinese Communist Party as well as outgoing Premier Wen Jiabao. A summary of the proceedings was published by Xinhua, the official Chinese news agency. Xi Jinping, General Secretary of the Chinese Communist Party and Li Keqiang, incoming Premier of the People's Republic of China, addressed the conference. Increased urbanization was projected as a path to increasing domestic demand as a pathway to shifting emphasis to internal rather than export demand.

The keywords for the December 2012 conference were "healthy development"; in 2011 they were "steady growth". The theme healthy development reflects a change in concern from mere growth to restructuring of the economy in sustainable ways. Dealing with overreaching by "privileged people", anti-corruption efforts, was one theme expressed by official Chinese media.

The 2020 conference addressed the COVID-19 pandemic in mainland China and adherence to the 14th five-year plan (2021-2025).

References 

Economy of China
Government of China